Jessica Canseco (née Sekely; December 4, 1972 in Ashland, Ohio) is the former wife of Jose Canseco and author of a biography of her life with Canseco entitled Juicy: Confessions of a Former Baseball Wife.  She would later wed and divorce Garth Fisher, and star in Hollywood Exes.

Biography
While training as a waitress at Hooters in Cleveland, she met baseball player Jose Canseco. They married on August 27, 1996 and divorced in 1999.  They have a daughter, Josie Canseco.  Canseco's autobiography: Juicy: Confessions of a Former Baseball Wife was published the same year as Jose Canseco's memoir Juiced. Parts of her book were excerpted in a September 2005 cover story for Playboy. She appeared on Good Morning America and Entertainment Tonight to promote it.

On June 23, 2007, she married television personality and plastic surgeon Garth Fisher at his Bel Air mansion.  They divorced in 2011.

In March 2012, The Hollywood Reporter announced that Canseco will star in the new VH1 series Hollywood Exes, a 10-episode hour-long unscripted show to air in summer 2012.  she still has a starring role in Hollywood Exes, which is in its third season.

In March 2016, E! Online premiered The Mother/Daughter Experiment: Celebrity Edition in which Canseco starred with her daughter, Josie Canseco, attempting to improve their mother-daughter relationship.

See also
List of people in Playboy 2000–2009

References

External links

American women writers
Living people
Female models from Ohio
People from Ashland, Ohio
Place of birth missing (living people)
1972 births
21st-century American women